Priya David Clemens (born December 23, 1974) is an American journalist based in San Francisco.

Early life and education
Clemens was born Priya David in Madras (now Chennai), India. She grew up in Virginia, California, Brussels and London, where her father worked for an American company that worked with NATO.

Clemens was graduated with honors from Westmont College in 1997 with a bachelor's degree in anthropology and with a master's degree in broadcast journalism from University of Southern California in 2002.

Career
Clemens is the host of KQED Newsroom. Most recently, she was the spokesperson for the Golden Gate Bridge District, handling communications, media and policy for the Golden Gate Bridge, Golden Gate Ferry, and Golden Gate Transit bus system.

Clemens has worked as a CBS News correspondent based in New York City, reporting for the CBS Evening News and for The Early Show, and filling in as an occasional Saturday and Sunday CBS Evening News anchor. In 2008 and 2009. during the international sub-prime crisis, Clemens regularly reported on financial issues from the floor of the New York Stock Exchange.

She has also worked for KTVU in the San Francisco Bay Area as a reporter for Mornings on 2 and other news shows, and for MSNBC as an embedded presidential campaign reporter in 2004 - covering Dick Gephardt's presidential campaign and Dick Cheney's re-election bid, as well.  She also worked as an anchor for KOIN, the CBS affiliate in Portland, Oregon. She hosted Keep It Local, a daily, hour-long news show shot live at various locations in Oregon, and filled in as an anchor on KOIN's various news shows.

Personal life
In September, 2011, she and her family were subjected to an armed raid of their Alameda, California home, by the Martinez Police Department, the FBI, and the Alameda Police Department. The law enforcement officials had a search warrant for the previous owners of the home, who had moved out nearly three months earlier when David and her husband purchased the home.

References

1974 births
Living people
Westmont College alumni
Writers from Chennai
American television reporters and correspondents
American writers of Indian descent
USC Annenberg School for Communication and Journalism alumni
American expatriates in Belgium
Indian emigrants to the United States
American expatriates in the United Kingdom
American women television journalists
CBS News people
21st-century American women